This is a list of extreme points of Malta. The points that are farthest north, south, east or west than any other location. Malta is composed of an archipelago of seven islands.

Extreme Points of the Republic of Malta

Northernmost point – Reqqa Point, Gozo 
Northernmost settlement – Żebbuġ, Gozo 
Southernmost point – Filfla 
Southernmost settlement – Birżebbuġa, Malta 
Westernmost point – San Dimitri Point, Gozo
Westernmost Settlement – Saint Lawrence, Gozo 
Easternmost Point – Marsaskala, Malta 
Easternmost Settlement – Marsaskala, Malta 
Highest Point – Ta' Dmejrek, Malta  at 253 m

See also

Geography of Malta  
Extreme points of the European Union
Extreme points of Eurasia
Extreme points of Africa-Eurasia
Extreme points of Earth

Geography of Malta
Malta
Extreme